Cecil Henry Polhill, formerly Cecil Henry Polhill-Turner (23 February 1860 in Bedfordshire – 9 March 1938 in Hampstead, London) was a British Pentecostal leader and missionary.

Early life
Cecil Henry Polhill was born on 23 February 1860. His father was Frederick Polhill-Turner. He was educated at Eton College and Jesus College, Cambridge, before taking a commission as a Second Lieutenant in the Bedfordshire Yeomanry. In 1885 he and his brother, Arthur Twistleton Polhill, became affiliated with the China Inland Mission as part of the Cambridge Seven missionary band. In 1897, Polhill along with other four CIM missionaries established a missionary station in Tatsienlu, west of Szechwan, which paved the way for the future construction of the Gospel Church. He returned from China in 1900 in the wake of the Boxer Uprising.

Christian evangelism
Upon his return from China, Polhill inherited a fortune, and spent much of his life donating to missionary causes. In 1908 Polhill visited Azusa Street, Los Angeles, where he had a Pentecostal experience. Before returning to England Polhill wrote a cheque for £1500 to pay off the mortgage on the Azusa Street building. After returning to England Polhill attended Alexander Boddy's first Sunderland Convention, and helped Boddy fund his Pentecostal periodical Confidence. Polhill became the first President of the Pentecostal Missionary Union (PMU), and administered it along China Inland Mission lines. In 1925 the Executive Council of the PMU voted to merge with the British Assemblies of God, and so Polhill, an Anglican, resigned aged 65. He maintained friendly relationships with the PMU, and missionaries in the field.

Personal life
In 1888, he married Eleanor Agnes Marston, and their marriage produced six children, three daughters and three sons.

Death
He died on 9 March 1938 Hampstead, London.

See also 
 Anglicanism in Sichuan
 Christianity in Tibet

References

External links
The Polhill Collection Online

1860 births
1938 deaths
Military personnel from Bedfordshire
English Anglican missionaries
English Pentecostals
People from Bedfordshire (before 1965)
People educated at Eton College
Alumni of Jesus College, Cambridge
Anglican missionaries in Sichuan
Anglican missionaries in China
Anglican missionaries in India
Protestant missionaries in Tibet
Bedfordshire Yeomanry officers
British expatriates in China
Pentecostal missionaries